Salmon Brook is one of the six major tributaries of the Merrimack River in northeastern Massachusetts in the United States. It passes through Dunstable, Massachusetts, and Nashua, New Hampshire.

Route description 
Salmon Brook begins at the outlet of Lower Massapoag Pond near the center of Dunstable. The water body farthest upstream in the watershed is Martins Pond just east of the center of the town of Groton. The outlet, Martins Pond Brook, runs southeast to Lost Lake/Knops Pond, the start of a chain of lakes that includes Whitney Pond, Cow Pond, and Upper and Lower Massapoag ponds. All of these water bodies are dammed. Salmon Brook runs roughly parallel to the Nashua River for its entire course from Lower Massapoag Pond to the Merrimack River.

See also

List of rivers of Massachusetts
List of rivers of New Hampshire

References

Tributaries of the Merrimack River
Rivers of Middlesex County, Massachusetts
Rivers of New Hampshire
Nashua, New Hampshire
Rivers of Massachusetts
Rivers of Hillsborough County, New Hampshire